Ndiritu is a Kenyan given name and surname. Notable people with the name include:

Ndiritu Muriithi, Kenyan politician
Grace Ndiritu (born 1982), Kenyan visual artist

Bantu-language surnames
Surnames of Kenyan origin